Liam Diaz is a Canadian actor from Toronto, Ontario. He is most noted for his performance as Bing in the 2021 film Scarborough, for which he won the Canadian Screen Award for Best Actor at the 10th Canadian Screen Awards in 2022.

References

External links

21st-century Canadian male actors
21st-century Serbian male actors
Canadian male film actors
Canadian male child actors
Canadian male actors of Filipino descent
Male actors from Toronto
Living people
Year of birth missing (living people)
Best Actor Genie and Canadian Screen Award winners